Hannah Calvert  is a South African water polo player. She competed in the 2020 Summer Olympics.

References

1995 births
Living people
South African female water polo players
Olympic water polo players of South Africa
Water polo players at the 2020 Summer Olympics
20th-century South African women
21st-century South African women